Totarol is a naturally produced diterpene that is bioactive as totarol. It was first isolated by McDowell and Esterfield from the heartwood of Podocarpus totara, a conifer tree found in New Zealand. Podocarpus totara was investigated for unique molecules due to the tree's increased resistance to rotting. Recent studies have confirmed totarol's unique antimicrobial and therapeutic properties. Consequently, totarol is a candidate for a new source of drugs and has been the goal of numerous syntheses.

Occurrence 
Although totarol was first isolated in Podocarpus totara, totarol has also been identified in numerous other species of Podocarpaceae and Cupressaceae, with the majority found in the genus Podocarpus of the family Podocarpaceae and the subfamily Cupressoideae of the family Cupressaceae.
Outside Podocarpus and Cupressoideae, totarol is rarely found in the plant kingdom. However, totarol has recently been isolated in Rosmarinus officinalis (rosemary). The gymnosperms that contain totarol are distributed worldwide but are concentrated in North America, the far-south regions of South America, East Asia and East Africa.

Biological activity

Antimicrobial activity 
Totarol motivates research in drug discovery due to its ability to inhibit numerous microorganisms. Totarol exhibits antimicrobial properties in numerous species including gram-positive bacteria, acid-fast bacteria, nematodes, parasitic protozoans, crustaceous foulers (Table 1). In addition to inhibiting microorganisms by itself, totarol exhibits inhibitory synergy with currently used antimicrobial drugs: totarol potentiates isonicotinic acid hydrazide against various Mycobacteria.; methicillin against Mycobacterium tuberculosis and Staphylococcus aureus; and anacardic acid and erythromycin against Staphylococcus aureus. In nature, totarol is a key player in gymnosperm's defense against harmful microbes: gymnosperms that produce totarol are resistant to rotting.

Table 1.  Antibacterial activity of totarol against microorganisms

Mechanism of antimicrobial inhibition 
Although totarol exhibits antimicrobial properties, the mode of action is unclear and various methods of inhibitory action have been proposed. In Staphylococcus aureus strains resistant to penicillin via creation of penicillin binding protein 2’ (PBP2’), totarol may inhibit the synthesis of PBP2’. Totarol may inhibit effluxing Staphylococcus aureus strains through inhibition of MsrA, although it is unclear if MsrA is an efflux pump. Totarol may also gain its antibacterial properties by inhibiting bacterial respiratory transport but this is very unlikely because totarol is also effective against anaerobic organisms. Recently totarol was also hypothesized to inhibit gram-positive and acid-fast bacteria via inhibition of FtsZ protein, which forms the Z-ring, a polymer necessary for efficient bacterial cell cytokinesis.

Totarol may also function by disrupting the structural integrity of the phospholipid bilayer of bacteria by weakening Van der Waals interactions with its phenolic group, which also results in bacterial cells unable to synthesize ATP. Motivation for totarol functioning via disruption of membrane structure is due to its high phospholipid/water partition coefficient. However, totarol's partitioning capability was only observed at concentrations 10 to 100 fold higher than required for antibacterial activity. Thus it is unlikely that totarol is an uncoupler of bacterial respiration at the low levels observed in antimicrobial studies.

Traditional medicine 
The use of Podocarpus totara extract in Maori medicines for treatment of fevers, asthma, coughs, cholera, distemper, chest complaints and venereal disease dates back to over 100 years.  Despite totarol's antimicrobial potential, its commercial use is currently limited to cosmetic purposes. For totarol to be used clinically, its mode of action needs to be clearly defined.

Biochemical properties 
Totarol decreases the plasma levels of estrogens and can also effectively reduce pathogenic hepatic cells in vitro.  Totarol's anti-cancer activity is hypothesized to be due to the natural product's ability to form an o-quinone methide in vivo. Totarol also prevents cells from undergoing oxidative stress in vitro by acting as a hydrogen donor to peroxy radicals or reacting with other peroxy radicals to terminate undesirable radical reactions.

Biosynthesis 
Totarol is a precursor to the formation of nagilactones that possess antifungal properties not possessed by totarol. Consequently, gymnosperms that produce totarol and nagilactones are able to defend themselves against bacteria and fungi.

The biosynthesis of totarol was difficult to determine. The main reason for the challenge in determining how the secondary metabolite is produced is because totarol does not follow the isoprene rule: the isopropyl group of totarol is in the “wrong” place at C14. Initially, it was hypothesized that totarol and the “normal” diterpene ferruginol, also found in Podocarpaceae, were derived by a precursor 2 that would be dehydrated and have its isopropyl group migrate to produce totarol 1 and ferruginol  3 (Scheme 1).  This hypothesis was motivated by the well known santonin-desmotroposantonin rearrangement of steroid dienones into aromatic compounds. It is now accepted that totarol is synthesized biologically from ferruginol. Geranyl geranyl pyrophosphate 4 undergoes typical diterpene cyclization to form (−)-abietadiene 5, which is oxidized to form ferruginol 3, which proceeds through a spiro intermediate to form totarol (Scheme 2).

Synthesis 

Totarol has been the subject of numerous syntheses.  The first total synthesis of totarol (Scheme 3) utilized 6 and the alkyne 7 to yield 8 which was converted to the corresponding ketone 9 via hydrogenation followed by cyclization with polyphosphoric acid. 9 was subsequently converted to 10 and another ketone that were inseparable by chromatography. The synthesis was finalized by treatment with N-Bromosuccinimide followed by debromination to yield (±)-totarol. The main downfall of this synthesis was that in multiple steps, complete conversion of reactant to products was not observed and undesirable side products were often not separable by chromatography. However, since this was the first total synthesis of (±)-totarol, it is notable.

Total enantioselective synthesis 

The first total enantioselective synthesis of totarol was achieved in 1979 (Scheme 4). The key step in the synthesis is the formation of 13 via a Wittig reaction between 11 and 12. This same cyclization can also be achieved via a Friedel-Crafts alkylation and cyclization. Subsequent hydrogenation of 13 followed by intramolecular cyclization with aluminium chloride forms the B ring and totarylmethyl ether which is demethylated by boron tribromide to yield totarol.

A more recent organic synthesis of totarol was achieved by utilizing 14, a lamdane diterpene named zamoranic acid (Scheme 5). The addition of the isopropyl group in the chemical synthesis was achieved with complete stereoselectivity. Acetylation to yield 15 required high temperatures due to the steric hindrance of the isopropyl group. Cis-hydroxylation followed by cleavage with H5IO6 yielded a diol that was acylated in pyridine and oxidized to give 16. The key step in the synthesis was the cyclization of ring C: 16 was treated with SmI2 to yield totarane diastereomers which were separated by column chromatography. The desired diastereomer was treated with p-TsOH in benzene to yield 17. The synthesis was completed by a halogenation-dehydrogenation sequence and subsequent bromination to yield 18 and ring aromatization with elimination via a lithium complex.

Total chemoenzymatic synthesis 

Chemoenzymatic synthesis of totarol has also been achieved with high yield (41.8%) (Scheme 6). A racemic beta-keto ester 19 undergoes lipase-assisted resolution to yield chiral alcohol 20. Treatment of 20 with 10% HCl and p-TsOH gives αβ-unsaturated ketone 21. A Michael addition with the anion obtained from the reaction of methyl 5-methyl-3-oxohexanoate 13 with NaOMe gives a 2:1 diastereomeric mixture of 22 which is hydrolyzed to yield 23 which is brominated and debrominated to yield totarol.

Other uses 
Totarol may also be used as an indicator for the quality of juniper berry based spirits. Juniper berries that contain diterpenoids including totarol are used for the aromatization and production of some gins.  Consequently, totarol can aid in the characterization of different types of gin or commercial brands, vouching for the authenticity and quality of the product.

Totarol has been found on the posterior tibia of Frieseomelitta silvestrii languida, a species of stingless bees from Brazil. Frieseomelitta silvestrii languida collect resin to create a protective barrier around the opening of their nest to ward off insects from settling near the nest's entrance.  The presence of totarol can aid in the determination of this bee species.

References 

Terpeno-phenolic compounds
Diterpenes
Phenanthrenes
Phenols
Isopropyl compounds